Carlos Alberto de Oliveira (born 23 May 1972), known as Capone, is a former Brazilian footballer.

Club statistics

Honours

Mogi Mirim

Campeonato Paulista Série A2: 1 (1995)

Juventude

Campeonato Gaúcho: 1 (1998)
Copa do Brasil: 1 (1999)

Galatasaray

Turkish Cup: 1 (1999–2000)
UEFA Cup: 1 (1999–2000)
Turkish Super League: 2 (1999–2000, 2001–02)
UEFA Super Cup: 1 (2000)

Corinthians

Campeonato Paulista: 1 (2003)

External links
sports.geocities.jp

1972 births
Living people
Brazilian footballers
Brazilian expatriate footballers
Associação Atlética Ponte Preta players
Mogi Mirim Esporte Clube players
São Paulo FC players
Kyoto Sanga FC players
Esporte Clube Juventude players
Galatasaray S.K. footballers
Kocaelispor footballers
Sport Club Corinthians Paulista players
Club Athletico Paranaense players
Beitar Jerusalem F.C. players
Grêmio Foot-Ball Porto Alegrense players
Associação Atlética Portuguesa (Santos) players
Londrina Esporte Clube players
J1 League players
Expatriate footballers in Israel
Expatriate footballers in Japan
Brazilian expatriate sportspeople in Turkey
Expatriate footballers in Turkey
Süper Lig players
UEFA Cup winning players
Association football defenders
Sportspeople from Campinas